Esther J. Trimble Lippincott (Trimble; March 2, 1838 — June 2, 1888) was an American educator, reformer, and non-fiction author. She served as professor of elocution and literature at Swarthmore College, and West Chester State Normal School. The Quaker naturalist, illustrator, and social reformer, Graceanna Lewis, was Lippincott's cousin.

Early life
Esther Jane Trimble was born on a farm near Kimberton, Pennsylvania, March 2, 1838. She was the only daughter of Joseph Trimble and his wife, Rebecca Fussell. Her father died when she was about eighteen months of age. As she grew older, she developed a love for literature, and chose its study as her life-work.

Career
Her proficiency was such that she was invited to become an instructor in that branch in Swarthmore College, Pennsylvania. Later, she became a professor of literature in the normal school of West Chester, Pennsylvania (now West Chester University). From her early adulthood, her feeling of independence led her to take pride in self-maintenance, and to care for her widowed mother. She married Isaac Howey Lippincott (1828–1884), of Woodstown, New Jersey, 1882. He died at the end of two years.

After she became a widow, she visited Europe to further her studies. As an author she was successful in the preparation of a Chart of General Literature, a Hand-Book of English and American Literature, and a Short Course of Literature. These became standard works in schools and colleges. A paper prepared by her, entitled "Law versus License," indicated her feeling on the temperance issue. She left behind manuscripts which she was anxious to publish before her death.

Lippincott was deeply interested in issues pertaining to human welfare, and believed in the cardinal duty of obedience to the Inward light, recognized by the Society of Friends, of which she was a member. In every effort to create homes for invalids, she was in special sympathy, and before her death, left a substantial amount of money for the founding of several such homes in Philadelphia. She lectured on temperance and literature (Chaucer, or The Dawn of English Literature; The Elizabethan Age; The Artificial School of Writers; Burns; Cowper; The Age of Scott and Byron; Wordsworth and his Contemporaries; The Victorian Writers; American Literature; Wits and Humorists of the 19th Century; London; My Pilgrimage to Canterbury).

Death
Lippincott died in Philadelphia, June 2, 1888. She was buried in the Friends' Burial Ground, in Merion, near to her father and mother.

Selected works
 A Chart of General Literature, from the earliest times, embracing a complete outline of English literature, with the prominent writers of other nations
 Chart of Ancient Literature, Philadelphia, J. M. Stoddart & Co., 1875
 A Hand Book of Euglish and American Literature, Philadelphia, Eldridge & Bro., 1882
 A Short Course in Literature, English and American, for the use of schools and academies. Philadelphia, Eldridge & Bro., 1883

Notes

References

Attribution

External links
 
 

1838 births
1888 deaths
19th-century American educators
19th-century American women writers
19th-century American non-fiction writers
American social reformers
Swarthmore College faculty
West Chester University faculty
People from Chester County, Pennsylvania
American women academics
Wikipedia articles incorporating text from A Woman of the Century